Verona Murphy (born 1971) is an Irish Independent politician who has been a Teachta Dála (TD) for the Wexford constituency since the 2020 general election. Murphy is President of the Irish Road Haulage Association (IRHA).

Early life 
Murphy was born and raised in Ramsgrange. She dropped out of school at 15 to pursue work. She later returned to education, doing her Leaving Cert in her 30s and graduating with a BA in Law from Institute of Technology, Carlow.

Political career

2019 Wexford by-election
She was selected as the Fine Gael candidate for the November 2019 Wexford by-election, which was called after the election of Mick Wallace to the European Parliament. During the by-election campaign, Murphy made remarks supporting Noel Grealish's attempts to block a Direct Provision centre being created in Oughterard, County Galway, and suggested that immigrants coming to Ireland were being "infiltrated by ISIS" and would need to be "deprogrammed". She claimed that immigrants as young as "three or four years old" were a danger because of ISIS brainwashing and that ISIS is a “big part” of the migrant population in Ireland.

These remarks were criticised by the Irish Refugee Council and by members of opposition parties in the Dáil. Murphy subsequently apologised for her remarks and issued a statement, stating "This was a very poor choice of words and I am very sorry to anyone who was offended by them. People coming here fleeing persecution deserve to be treated with compassion and respect. They need to be given opportunities to forge a new start for themselves and their families. That is why we have direct provision: to provide board and lodging to people seeking asylum".

However, following the apology, Murphy released a campaign video on YouTube in which she claimed that she had been "the victim of “character assassination in the media." This prompted the leader of Fine Gael and Taoiseach Leo Varadkar to comment directly on Murphy, stating the video was "bizarre" and "not party-approved". Several other top-ranking members of Fine Gael were also disturbed by her campaign, including Tánaiste Simon Coveney, who stated that Murphy's comments were wrong, and her choice of language about migrants was not acceptable. Murphy refused to participate in any of the by-election debates or panel discussions during the campaign. Fine Gael stated it was aware of allegations against Murphy of workplace bullying before the campaign began.

On election day, Murphy received 9,543 (23.8%) first preference votes and was eliminated on the fourth count. Despite the defeat, Murphy insisted on election day that she would be Fine Gael's candidate in the 2020 general election.

Removal from Fine Gael ticket
In December 2019, Fine Gael de-selected Murphy as a candidate for 2020 general election, as a result of her behaviour during the November by-election. When asked again about Murphy after the by-election, Leo Varadkar stated "quite frankly I'm glad she didn't get elected" and remarked; "What was done subsequently in terms of the video she did which sort of tried to imply the whole thing was a media character assassination attempt on her – I had a big problem with that because maybe it suggested to me that the apology and retraction wasn’t fully sincere." Furthermore, Varadkar declared that it had been a "mistake" by Fine Gael to select Murphy as a candidate, a mistake for which he took responsibility.

Following her de-selection, Murphy left Fine Gael.

2020 general election
In the 2020 general election, Murphy was elected as an independent TD in the Wexford constituency.

In November 2021 Murphy was accused of spreading anti-vax information in the Dáil by health minister Stephen Donnelly after Murphy stated studies had shown "that a vaccinated person is every bit as likely to transmit this virus as a non-vaccinated person". Despite her assertions, Murphy insisted she was not "Anti-Vax" and had been vaccinated herself, but believed the choice to take vaccinations was up to the individual.

Personal life 
Murphy ran a haulage firm, Drumur Transport, with her business partner Joseph Druhan. The business closed in 2021.

References

Living people
1971 births
Members of the 33rd Dáil
21st-century women Teachtaí Dála
Fine Gael politicians
Independent TDs
Politicians from County Wexford
Alumni of Institute of Technology, Carlow